The dwarf musk deer or Chinese forest musk deer (Moschus berezovskii) is an artiodactyl native to southern and central China and northernmost Vietnam. The species name is after the collector Mikhail Mikhailovich Berezovsky. On June 14, 1976, China entered the dwarf musk deer onto its endangered species list. Four subspecies are recognized:

Moschus berezovskii berezovskii Flerov, 1929
Moschus berezovskii bijiangensis Wang & Li, 1993
Moschus berezovskii caobangis Dao, 1969
Moschus berezovskii yanguiensis Wang & Ma, 1993

Parasites 

As most animals, the dwarf musk deer harbours a number of parasites. In 2021, a study showed that ten species of Eimeria, which are apicomplexan protozoans living in the digestive tract, were specific of this host.

References

Notes

Musk deer
Mammals described in 1929
Endangered Fauna of China